Olive Lillian Irvine (21 June 1895 – 1 November 1969) was a Canadian teacher and politician.

Born in Holland, Manitoba, the daughter of R. J. Mills, Irvine attended public school in Portage la Prairie and at the Winnipeg Normal School. She then became a teacher in Winnipeg. She married James C. Irvine on 14 January 1920.

She was President of the Women's Conservative Association of Manitoba. Irvine was appointed the representative from Manitoba on the National Capital Commission in 1959.

A Progressive Conservative, she was appointed to the Senate of Canada on 14 January 1960 on the recommendation of Prime Minister John Diefenbaker, and she represented the senatorial division of Lisgar, Manitoba until her death.

She died in Ottawa on 1 November 1969 and was buried in Winnipeg's Chapel Lawn Memorial Gardens.

The Senator's granddaughter Gail Marie Wright nee Irvine now (2021) resides at Bowview Manor, a seniors home in Calgary. Gail has 10 grandchildren.

References 

1895 births
1969 deaths
Canadian senators from Manitoba
Progressive Conservative Party of Canada senators
Women members of the Senate of Canada
Women in Manitoba politics
20th-century Canadian women politicians